No. 2 Squadron is a Royal Australian Air Force (RAAF) squadron that operates from RAAF Base Williamtown, near Newcastle, New South Wales. From its formation in 1916 as part of the Australian Flying Corps, it has flown a variety of aircraft types including fighters, bombers, and Airborne Early Warning & Control (AEW&C). During World War I, the squadron operated on the Western Front conducting fighter sweeps and ground-attack missions. It was disbanded in mid-1919, following the end of hostilities. The squadron was briefly re-raised in 1922 as part of the newly independent RAAF, but was disbanded after only a couple of months and not reformed until 1937. It saw action as a bomber unit in the South West Pacific theatre of World War II and, equipped with English Electric Canberra jets, in the Malayan Emergency and the Vietnam War. The squadron was again disbanded in 1982, following the retirement of the Canberra. It was re-formed in 2000 to operate the Boeing 737 AEW&C "Wedgetail". One of the six Boeing 737s was deployed to the Middle East in September 2014, as part of Australia's contribution to the military coalition against ISIS.

History

World War I
On 20 September 1916, No. 2 Squadron was established as a unit of the Australian Flying Corps (AFC) at Kantara, Egypt, drawing personnel mainly from Australian Light Horse units of the Australian Imperial Force (AIF). Shortly after forming, under the command of Major Oswald Watt, the unit was transferred to the United Kingdom to complete training, arriving at Harlaxton on 30 January 1917.  Between February and September 1917, the squadron undertook training with Royal Flying Corps units before being equipped with Airco DH.5 fighters. To differentiate the squadron from the British No. 2 Squadron RFC, it was known to the British military as "No. 68 Squadron RFC". This terminology was never accepted by the AIF who continued to use the AFC designation regardless, and by January 1918 the British designation was officially discontinued.

In late September 1917, the squadron flew its aircraft across the English Channel, landing in St Omer without incident or loss – and after overnighting there it moved to Baizieux. Assigned to the 13th Army Wing, RFC, it undertook its first combat operations on the Western Front a month later. Its first major action came during the Battle of Cambrai in November and December when it was heavily involved as a low-level ground attack unit, attacking German trenches, but suffering heavy casualties in doing so. On 22 November, the squadron shot down its first German aircraft in air-to-air combat during a chance encounter on a ground attack sortie. After this, several more German aircraft were shot down by the squadron's pilots before the squadron was withdrawn from operations in December to re-equip with Royal Aircraft Factory S.E.5a fighters. In January 1918, the squadron moved to Savy, and the following month gained its first victories with the new aircraft type.

During early 1918, the Germans launched a major offensive on the Western Front after the collapse of Russia allowed them to increase their forces in the west. Falling initially against the British southern flank, the offensive pushed the Allies back significantly, and the squadron was forced to withdraw to airfields further back from the front as German forces advanced steadily: on 2 April it moved from Savy to Bertangles, on 4 April to La Bellevue and then on 4 June to Fouquerolles, remaining there until 21 June when it moved to Liettres to support the French during the Marne offensive. During this time, the squadron was attached to the Royal Air Force's Nos 10, 22, 51 and (finally) 80 wings. Despite the moves, the squadron maintained a high operational tempo, becoming involved in heavy air-to-air combat during fighter sweeps, and also being used to attack advancing German ground forces (see image left). After the German offensive was finally halted, the Allies launched their own offensive in August around Amiens after which the squadron was employed to attack German airfields, and as the Germans were forced back, attacking withdrawing German troops on the ground. Throughout October, in an effort to keep up with the advance, the squadron moved three times and by the time the armistice was signed in November it was based at Pont-a-Marq.

Following the conclusion of hostilities, the squadron was withdrawn to the United Kingdom in March 1919 as the demobilisation process began. On 6 May its personnel embarked on the transport Kaisar-i-Hind for repatriation back to Australia, at which time the squadron was disbanded. During the war, No. 2 Squadron produced 18 flying aces, including Francis Ryan Smith, Roy Cecil Phillipps (the squadron's highest scorer), Roby Lewis Manuel, Henry Garnet Forrest, Adrian Cole, Eric Douglas Cummings, Richard Watson Howard, Frank Alberry, Ernest Edgar Davies, and James Wellwood. The squadron's total score was 94 aircraft shot down, 73 out of control and 18 driven down. Its casualties amounted to 25 personnel killed and eight wounded.

World War II
In 1922, No. 2 Squadron was briefly re-formed as part of the newly independent Royal Australian Air Force at Point Cook, Victoria, but it never progressed beyond a cadre unit and was disbanded a few months later. It was re-formed again on 3 May 1937 at Laverton. Following the outbreak of World War II, under the command of Squadron Leader Alan Charlesworth, the squadron began maritime patrol and convoy escort operations off the Australian eastern seaboard, operating Avro Ansons, before being re-equipped with Lockheed Hudsons in May and June 1940.

Wing Commander Frank Headlam took over command of the squadron in April 1941, and in early December 1941, shortly before Japan's entry into the war, the squadron moved to Darwin, Northern Territory where it maintained its maritime role and deployed detachments to the islands to Australia's north, including Ambon in the Dutch East Indies. After the outbreak of the Pacific War, the squadron mounted reconnaissance and bombing missions against Japanese forces, focusing on Japanese shipping. Success came early with a  Japanese vessel being heavily damaged on 8 December, although heavy losses also came early on. In early 1942, the squadron's detachments were withdrawn back to Australia as Japanese forces advanced south, attacking the squadron's forward bases. Wing Commander Tich McFarlane took over command of the unit in April. The squadron continued operations after its return to Australia, maintaining an intense bombing campaign against Japanese shipping and installations on islands including Timor and Ambon from May to October during which 13 crews were killed. For its service, the squadron was awarded a US Presidential Unit Citation.

Throughout 1942–1943, the squadron continued operations with its Hudsons against the Japanese in the East Indies and conducted aerial resupply for elements of Sparrow Force that were fighting on Timor.  Late in 1943, the squadron began training on the Bristol Beaufort, completing its conversion in January 1944. The squadron operated the type only briefly, alongside a small number of remaining Hudsons before converting to the North American B-25 Mitchell in May. After being withdrawn from operations briefly, it recommenced combat missions in late June, focusing on anti-shipping strikes, but also attacking Japanese airfields. Late in the war, No. 2 Squadron moved to Balikpapan in Borneo where it was used to drop supplies to Allied troops in Japanese prisoner-of-war camps before undertaking transportation duties following the end of hostilities. The squadron returned to Australia in mid-December 1945 and was disbanded in May 1946 at Laverton. Casualties during the war amounted to 176 killed.

Post-World War II

In the post-World War II period, the squadron was reformed briefly as a communications squadron based at Mallala, South Australia, in June 1947 before a reorganisation early the following year saw it redesignated as No. 34 Squadron, while the previously existing No. 21 Squadron, equipped with Avro Lincolns at RAAF Base Amberley, became No. 2 Squadron. In 1953, the squadron was re-equipped with GAF Canberras, which it later operated from RAAF Butterworth during the Malayan Emergency, after deploying there in 1958 to relieve the Lincoln-equipped No. 1 Squadron RAAF. During the emergency, the squadron undertook airstrikes against communist forces and after the conflict ended, it remained in Malaysia throughout the early 1960s during Confrontation, before despatching eight Canberras to South Vietnam in April 1967 as part of Australia's commitment to the Vietnam War.

Based at Phan Rang Air Base in Ninh Thuan province, the unit became part of the United States Air Force 35th Tactical Fighter Wing (35 TFW) and between April 1967 and June 1971, the Canberras flew approximately 12,000 sorties. Although the squadron initially undertook high-level night-time attacks, the majority of its operations were low-level daylight attacks; and according to historian Steve Eather the squadron achieved a high success rate, accounting for 16 percent of 35 TFW's assessed bomb damage despite flying only five percent of its missions, while maintaining a 97–98 percent serviceability rate. It dropped 76,389 bombs and was credited with 786 enemy personnel confirmed killed and a further 3,390 estimated killed; with 8,637 structures, 15,568 bunkers, 1,267 sampans and 74 bridges destroyed. An aircraft from the squadron responded to a distress call on 24 April 1969 and, against operational orders, bombed a site in Cambodia (the Fishhook) where US special forces were pinned down.  Two crew members were killed, two squadron members died of disease, and three from accidents during the war, and two Canberras were shot down in 1970 and 1971. One was brought down by a surface-to-air missile from which the crewmen – one of whom was the squadron commander, Wing Commander Frank Downing – safely ejected and were rescued via helicopter, and another was lost during a bombing run near the Laos border. The crew of the latter aircraft, Flying Officer Michael Herbert and Pilot Officer Robert Carver, were not recovered during the war and were posted as "missing in action"; however the wreckage of their Canberra was finally located in April 2009 and their remains returned to Australia. The squadron was awarded the Vietnam Gallantry Cross Unit Citation and a United States Air Force Outstanding Unit Commendation for its service in Vietnam. During the deployment, the squadron's aircraft used the callsign "Magpie" in recognition of the squadron's emblem.

The squadron returned to Australia in 1971, having been deployed overseas for a total of 13 years. After Vietnam, No. 2 Squadron was based at Amberley, west of Brisbane, Queensland. It briefly returned to bombing role in training, but in the later years of the Canberra bomber's RAAF operations, it was predominately used for target towing in support of the RAAF's fleet of Dassault Mirage III fighters and survey photography to support the aerial mapping of Australia and other locations including Papua New Guinea, Irian Jaya and the Cocos and Christmas Islands. Eventually, the squadron's Canberra bombers were retired from service and in late July 1982 the squadron was disbanded.

The squadron was re-formed in January 2000 to operate Boeing 737 Airborne Early Warning & Control (AEW&C) aircraft procured as part of Project Wedgetail, out of RAAF Base Williamtown and RAAF Base Tindal. On 26 November 2009, the RAAF accepted the first two of six Boeing 737s, and by the end of 2010, the squadron had begun training. In 2011, after a period of conversion training for its crews, it took part in Exercise Talisman Sabre with US and Australian forces. The squadron forms part of the Surveillance & Response Group's No. 42 Wing, which is responsible for the RAAF's AEW&C capability. On 14 September 2014, the Federal government committed to deploying one of the squadron's Boeing 737s to Al Minhad Air Base in the United Arab Emirates, as part of a coalition to combat Islamic State forces in Iraq. The aircraft began undertaking missions in Iraq on 1 October.

Equipment

|-
|D.H.5
|UK
|biplane
|fighter
|1916
|1917
|80
|first Australian fighter
|-
|S.E.5a
|UK
|biplane
|fighter
|1918
|1919
|
|
|-
|Anson
|UK
|prop
|maritime patrol
|1937
|1940
|
|
|-
|Hudson
|USA
|prop
|patrol bomber
|1940
|1943
|
|
|-
|Beaufort
|UK
|prop
|torpedo bomber
|1943
|1944
|
|
|-
|B-25 Mitchell
|USA
|prop
|bomber
|1944
|1946
|
|
|-
|Lincoln
|UK
|prop
|heavy bomber
|1947
|1953
|
|
|-
|Canberra
|AUS
|jet
|bomber
|1953
|1982
|
|
|-
|E-7A Wedgetail
|USA
|jet
|AEW&C
|2009
|Active
|
|
|}

Notes

References

Further reading

 
 

2
2
2
2
1916 establishments in Australia
Cold War history of Australia
068 Squadron
Military units and formations established in 1916
Military units and formations disestablished in 1919
Military units and formations established in 1922
Military units and formations disestablished in 1922
Military units and formations established in 1937
Military units and formations disestablished in 1982
Military units and formations established in 2000